Heath B. Sherman (born March 27, 1967 in Wharton, Texas) is a former professional American football running back in the National Football League for five seasons for the Philadelphia Eagles.  He played college football at Texas A&I University and was drafted in the sixth round of the 1989 NFL Draft.

1967 births
Living people
People from Wharton, Texas
American football fullbacks
Philadelphia Eagles players
Texas A&M–Kingsville Javelinas football players